Ecuador Figueroa (born 18 March 1953) is an Ecuadorian footballer. He played in one match for the Ecuador national football team in 1979. He was also part of Ecuador's squad for the 1979 Copa América tournament.

References

External links
 

1953 births
Living people
Ecuadorian footballers
Ecuador international footballers
Place of birth missing (living people)
Association football defenders
C.S. Emelec footballers